Greg Melvill-Smith (1961 – 31 May 2016), was a South African actor, director, writer and voice artist. A founding member of the South African Guild of Actors (SAGA), Melvill-Smith is best known for the roles in the television serials such as; Die Vierde Kabinet, 7de Laan, One Way and Isidingo as well as many stage plays across the country.

Personal life
Melvill-Smith was born in 1961 in South Africa. In 1984, he completed the National Diploma in Drama at Pretoria Technikon (currently known as Tshwane University of Technology).

He was married to Kenda and was a father of two daughters: Kaila and Natasha.

In October 2015, Melvill-Smith was diagnosed with cancer. He died on 31 May 2016 at the age of 55 from liver and kidney cancer. The memorial service was held on 4 June 2016 at St Peter's Prep School Chapel, Wittkoppen Road in Johannesburg.

Career
After completing the diploma, he joined the Loft Theatre Company at NAPAC in 1985. Then he performed in many stage plays for three years under the company. Then he moved to Johannesburg in 1988 and worked as a freelance actor. Since then, he acted in many theatre plays such as; The Queen (1995), Love! Valour! Compassion! (1996), King Lear (1998), Vlerkdans (1999), Anthony and Cleopatra (1999) and Sella ou Storie (2004). In 2005, he appeared in Horror Scope at the Grahamstown Festival where he played the role "Tchaikovsky" in a Salon Music production in Pretoria. Then in 2008, he performed in an Actors Centre production Faustus.

In the meantime, he made notable roles in the two plays: Kwamanzi and Horn of Sorrow, both made European tours. He then wrote and directed the stage play Walking Tall. Besides, he directed the operas such as Don Pasquale in 2001, and then Lucia Di Lamamoor and De Fledermaus in 2002. His contribution to Industrial Theatre presentations was significant where he also worked as member of the Theatre Sports team. He conducted Environmental Theatre Workshops, for about six years. In the meantime, he was also involved in Early Man workshops deals with anthropological heritage of South Africa.

As a presenter, he worked on the television program In Touch. In 1991, he appeared in the TV1 drama Die Sonkring with the role "Landdros". After that, he made notable appearances in the serials; 7de Laan, Wild at Heart and The Coconuts. In 2006, he joined with the cast of SABC3 drama serial One Way. He continued to play the role "Nathan" in the second season as well. In 2015, he acted in the Vuzu Amp serial aYeYe with the role "Wallie". Then he made a supportive role of "Mr Edwards" in the eleventh season of kykNET soap opera Binnelanders. In the same year, he joined with the second season of Hollywood period drama adventure serial Black Sails and played the role "Admiral Hennessey".

In 1988, he made film debut with the role of "bar fighter" in the film Blind Justice. Since then he acted in many feature films, such as; ''The Sorcerer's Apprentice for Peakviewing Productions, Mr Bones, Drum, The Bang Bang Club, Night Drive and District 9.

Filmography

References

External links
 IMDb

1961 births
2016 deaths
South African male film actors
South African male television actors
South African male stage actors
20th-century South African male actors
21st-century South African male actors
Deaths from liver cancer
Deaths from kidney cancer
Deaths from cancer in South Africa